The Blessed Benedict of Alignan (died 1268) was Benedictine abbot of Nôtre Dame de la Grasse (1224) and Bishop of Marseille (1229).

Biography
Benedict twice visited Palestine (1239–1242 and 1260–1262), where he helped the Knights Templar build the great castle of Safet.

Benedict founded a short-lived order, the Brothers of the Virgin, which was suppressed by the Council of Lyon (1274), and died a Franciscan. His writings include a letter to Pope Innocent IV and De Summa Trinitate et Fide Catholica in Decretalibus (circa 1260). Someone in his following wrote De constructione castri Saphet.

Notes

References

Jonathan Rubin, "Benoit d’Alignan and Thomas Agni: Two Western Intellectuals and the Study of Oriental Christianity in 13th-century Kingdom of Jerusalem," Viator 44.1 (Spring, 2013), pp. 189–199.
Attribution:

1268 deaths
Bishops of Marseille
French abbots
French Friars Minor
French Benedictines
13th-century French Roman Catholic bishops
Year of birth unknown
Christians of the Barons' Crusade